The  is an alleged Japanese strategic planning document from 1927 in which Prime Minister Baron Tanaka Giichi laid out for Emperor Hirohito a strategy to take over the world. The authenticity of the document was long accepted and it is still quoted in some Chinese textbooks, but historian John Dower states that "most scholars now agree that it was a masterful anti-Japanese hoax."

Background

The Tanaka Memorial was first published in the December 1929 edition of the Chinese publication "時事月報" (Current Affairs Monthly) in Nanking, a Nationalist Chinese publication. It was reproduced on 24 September 1931 on pp. 923–34 of China Critic, an English publication in Shanghai. The memorial contains the assertions:

The English translation of this document was in circulation before February 1934, and formed the foundation of the lead article on the front page of the first edition of The Plain Truth magazine published by Herbert W. Armstrong in February of that year, although it had first appeared in the less widely circulated Communist International magazine in 1931.

The Tanaka Memorial was depicted extensively by United States wartime propaganda as a sort of Japanese counterpart to Mein Kampf. The installments The Battle of China and Prelude to War of Frank Capra's Academy Award-winning movie series Why We Fight describe the Tanaka Memorial as the document that was the Japanese plan for war with the United States. The Tanaka Memorial was depicted the same way in Know Your Enemy: Japan, also directed by Capra during the war. As presented in these movies, the five sequential steps to achieve Japan's goal of conquests are:

Conquest of Manchuria
Conquest of China
Conquest of the Soviet Union or Siberia
Establishment of bases in the Pacific
Conquest of the United States

Its authenticity is not accepted by scholars today, but the Tanaka Memorial was widely accepted as authentic in the 1930s and 1940s because Japan's actions appeared to correspond with these plans. The authenticity seemed to be confirmed by the 1931 Mukden Incident, 1937 Second Sino-Japanese War, 1939 Battles of Khalkhin Gol, 1940 Japanese invasion of French Indochina, the 1941 attack on Pearl Harbor, and the subsequent Pacific War.  Historian Barak Kushner states:
There were several critical historical mistakes in the Tanaka Memorial that clearly demonstrate it a fake, but the fact that the message overlapped with Japan's general aims to militarily subdue China coincided with the belief elsewhere that the Memorial was genuine.

In 1940, Leon Trotsky published an account of how the document allegedly came to light. Soviet intelligence had obtained it from a high-placed mole in Tokyo but did not want to compromise their own security by publishing it openly, so they had leaked it through contacts that they had in the United States.

Journalist and popular historian Edwin P. Hoyt wrote that the Tanaka Memorial was an accurate representation "of what Prime Minister Tanaka had said and what the supernationalists had been saying for months." Iris Chang adds that the Japanese government at that time was so faction-ridden that it would have been impossible to carry out such a plan in any case. Historian Meirion Harries  wrote that the Tanaka Memorial "was one of the most successful 'dirty tricks' of the twentieth century – a bogus document so brilliantly conceived that thirty years later Westerners were still taken in by it". Likewise, historian William G. Beasley states that "the nature of this document, as published variously in English and Chinese, does not carry conviction as to its authenticity". Dr. Haruo Tohmatsu, Professor of Diplomacy and War History of International Relations at the National Defense Academy of Japan, states that "The 'Tanaka Memorial' never existed, but the Dalian conference of that year adopted resolutions that reflected these ideas."

Speculation of forgery
In the summer of 1927 (June 27 – July 7), Tanaka convened a "Far East Conference" with members of the Japanese Foreign Ministry, Army Ministry, Navy Ministry, and Finance Ministry. However, instead of producing a master plan for world domination, the result of the Conference was a rough consensus that Japan should support the Kuomintang government of China against the Chinese Communists, as long as the Japanese could convince General Zhang Zuolin to consolidate his base in a virtually autonomous Manchuria, which would serve as a buffer state, and would fall eventually within Japanese domination. It is alleged that the Tanaka Memorial is a secret report of this Conference.

When the Allies searched for incriminating documents to support war crime charges following the surrender of Japan, no drafts or copies of anything corresponding to the Tanaka Memorial appeared among them; a Japanese language "original" has never been produced despite extensive research efforts.

The origin of the Memorial is still in question. Because the initial edition of the Memorial was in Chinese, some Japanese historians have attributed it to Chinese sources, probably either Chinese Nationalists or Chinese Communists.

There have been claims of forgery by the Soviet Union to encourage war between China and Japan, and so to advance Soviet interests. The two theories are not mutually exclusive, as the Chinese Communist Party was a member of the Comintern under control of the Soviet Union, and Soviet policy from the 1930s was to wage a propaganda war against Japanese expansionism. Also, the first translation of the Memorial into English was done by the Communist Party USA and published in the December 1931 issue of Communist International magazine. It was later re-printed in book format.

In 1939, Peter Fleming claimed to have produced an ‘update’ to the Tanaka Memorial, by writing an imaginary report on a secret Allied strategy conference attended by Kuomintang leader Chiang Kai-shek, and having it leaked to the Japanese. This indicates that the Tanaka Memorial was known to be a forgery by the British prior to World War II.

While the Tanaka Memorial has been mentioned in newspapers and school textbooks in China, most Japanese historians contend that the document is a forgery.

See also
Know Your Enemy: Japan (1945)
Blood on the Sun (1945) film starring James Cagney
An Investigation of Global Policy with the Yamato Race as Nucleus

Notes

References

 ;  OCLC 44090600

Stein, Gordon Encyclopedia of Hoaxes, Gale Group, 1993. (On itself) 
Stephan, John T. "The Tanaka Memorial (1927): Authentic or Spurious?", Modern Asian Studies 7.4 (1973) pp. 733–745.
 Allen S. Whiting, China Eyes Japan, University of California Press, 1989.

External links
The Tanaka Memorial – Japan's Dream of World Empire – 1942 English translation, on the Internet Archive
These sources contest the authenticity of the Memorial:
encyclopedia.com
Japan Speaks about Conspiracy of Japan in 1932 (revealed by Kiyoshi Kawakami)
Conspiracy of Japan in the Tokyo Trial

These sources advocate the authenticity of the Memorial:
 Profound lessons in past incidents (a mirror of Chinese statement page of 1997)
 Prelude to War download on the Internet Archive
Leon Trotsky, an opponent of the USSR and CPC vouches for authenticity of the Memorial 1940

Conspiracy theories in Asia
Foreign relations of the Empire of Japan
Political forgery
1929 documents
1927 documents